Duli Pengiran Muda Al-Muhtadee Billah College (abbreviated as  MDPMAMB; colloquially known as  or simply MD) is a sixth form school located in Bandar Seri Begawan, Brunei. Established in 1974, it is the first sixth form college in the country, and has since provided sixth form education leading up to GCE A Level qualification.

History 
At the time of its establishment, Duli Pengiran Muda Al-Muhtadee Billah College was simply known as Sixth Form Centre and was housed at the present campus of Paduka Seri Begawan Sultan Science College at Jalan Muara. In 1979, it moved to the current campus in Gadong and eventually attained its present name on 17 April 1986.

Academic 
The college offers various A Level subjects in which students typically take three or four A-Level subjects for two years. The academic year starts at the end of February or early March, and ends with the A Level examination in October and November of the following year. Admission to the college, like the other sixth form schools in the country, is based on passing the GCE O Level examination during secondary years with credits. The taking of certain subjects may also require additional prerequisites, such as having been taking the same subjects in the previous level.

External links 
 Duli Pengiran Muda Al-Muhtadee Billah College website
 List of schools in Brunei

References 

Sixth form colleges in Brunei
Cambridge schools in Brunei
Educational institutions established in 1974
1974 establishments in Brunei